The United States competed at the 2018 Winter Olympics in Pyeongchang, South Korea, from February 9 to 25, 2018.

The United States had its least successful showing at a Winter Olympics since the 1998 Nagano Games, ranking fourth in both the gold and total medal count with 9 and 23 medals, respectively. There were some notable successes for the team. Jessie Diggins and Kikkan Randall won the cross-country skiing women's team sprint event to clinch the United States' first-ever Olympic gold medal in cross-country skiing. Skip John Shuster led his team to the United States' first-ever gold medal in curling, winning the men's curling over Sweden. The United States women's national ice hockey team won the gold in the women's ice hockey tournament for the first time since the inauguration of the sport in 1998 over the four-time defending gold medalist Canada in an overtime penalty shootout.

The United States earned medals in at least one event in 11 different sports, the most of any nation. These Games also included the 100th Winter Olympic gold medal for the Americans, won by Shaun White.

Medalists

The following U.S. competitors won medals at the games. In the by discipline sections below, medalists' names are bolded.

 Athletes who participated in preliminary rounds but not the final round.

Competitors

The following is the list of number of competitors participating at the Games per sport or discipline.

*The United States qualified for 12 positions in curling, but two athletes competed in both the 4-person and mixed doubles tournament.

Alpine skiing

Jacqueline Wiles was initially named to the team but withdrew after suffering knee and leg injuries in a February 3 World Cup race; the quota spot was filled by Tricia Mangan. Steven Nyman was initially named to the team but withdrew after tearing his right ACL during a training run; the quota spot was filled by Alice Merryweather.

Men

Women

Mixed

* - Winner decided by total time of fastest male and female skiers

Biathlon

Based on their Nations Cup rankings in the 2016–17 Biathlon World Cup, the United States qualified a team of 5 men and 5 women.

Men

Women

Mixed

Bobsleigh

Based on their rankings in the 2017–18 Bobsleigh World Cup, the United States qualified 8 sleds.

Men

Women

* – Denotes the driver of each sled

Cross-country skiing

Distance
Men

Women

Sprint
Men

Qualification legend: Q – Qualify on position in heat; q – Qualify on time in round

Women

Qualification legend: Q – Qualify on position in heat; q – Qualify on time in round

Curling

Summary

Men's tournament

Based on results from the 2016 World Men's Curling Championship and the 2017 World Men's Curling Championship, the United States qualified a men's team, consisting of five athletes, as one of the seven highest ranked nations.

Roster
The United States men's curling team curled out of the Duluth Curling Club in Duluth, Minnesota. They were selected by winning the 2017 United States Olympic Curling Trials.

Round-robin

The United States has a bye in draws 2, 6, and 10.

Draw 1
Wednesday, February 14, 09:05

Draw 3
Thursday, February 15, 14:05

Draw 4
Friday, February 16, 09:05

Draw 5
Friday, February 16, 20:05

Draw 7
Sunday, February 18, 09:05

Draw 8
Sunday, February 18, 20:05

Draw 9
Monday, February 19, 14:05

Draw 11
Tuesday, February 20, 20:05

Draw 12
Wednesday, February 21, 14:05

Semifinal
Thursday, February 22, 20:05

Gold medal game
Saturday, February 24, 15:35

Women's tournament

Based on results from the 2016 Ford World Women's Curling Championship and the 2017 World Women's Curling Championship, the United States qualified a women's team, consisting of five athletes, as one of the seven highest ranked nations.

Roster
The United States women's curling team curled out of the Four Seasons Curling Club in Blaine, Minnesota. They were selected by winning the 2017 United States Olympic Curling Trials.

Round-robin

The United States had a bye in draws 4, 7, and 11.

Draw 1
Wednesday, February 14, 14:05

Draw 2
Thursday, February 15, 09:05

Draw 3
Thursday, February 15, 20:05

Draw 5
Saturday, February 17, 09:05

Draw 6
Saturday, February 17, 20:05

Draw 8
Monday, February 19, 09:05

Draw 9
Monday, February 19, 20:05

Draw 10
Tuesday, February 20, 14:05

Draw 12
Wednesday, February 21, 20:05

Mixed doubles tournament

Based on results from the 2016 World Mixed Doubles Curling Championship and the 2017 World Mixed Doubles Curling Championship, the United States qualified a mixed doubles team, consisting of two athletes, as one of the seven highest ranked nations.

Roster
The United States Hamilton/Hamilton pair curled out of the Madison Curling Club in Middleton, Wisconsin. They were selected by winning the 2017 United States Mixed Doubles Curling Olympic Trials.

Round-robin

Draw 1
Thursday, February 8, 9:05

Draw 2
Thursday, February 8, 20:05

Draw 3
Friday, February 9, 8:35

Draw 4
Friday, February 9, 13:35

Draw 5
Saturday, February 10, 9:05

Draw 6
Saturday, February 10, 20:05

Draw 7
Sunday, February 11, 9:05

Figure skating

The United States qualified 14 figure skaters (seven male and seven female), based on its placement at the 2017 World Figure Skating Championships in Helsinki, Finland. The U.S. won the bronze medal in the team event for the second consecutive Olympics.

Individual

Mixed

Team

Freestyle skiing

Aerials
Men

Women

Freeskiing
Men

Women

Moguls
Men

Women

Ice hockey

The United States qualified a men's and women's team for a total of 48 athletes.

Summary

Men's tournament

The United States men's national ice hockey team qualified by finishing 5th in the 2015 IIHF World Ranking.

Following the National Hockey League's decision to pull out of the Olympics, the US team relied heavily on professionals from European leagues and the American Hockey League. The team eventually lost in the quarterfinals.

Roster

Preliminary round

Qualification playoff

Quarterfinal

Women's tournament

The United States women's national ice hockey team qualified by finishing 1st in the 2016 IIHF World Ranking.

Roster

Preliminary round

Semifinal

Gold medal game

Luge

Based on the results from the World Cups during the 2017–18 Luge World Cup season, the United States qualified 8 sleds.

Men

Women

Mixed/Open

Nordic combined

On January 25 Ben Berend received news that he would be the fifth American qualifier.

Short track speed skating

According to the ISU Special Olympic Qualification Rankings, United States qualified a total of 8 athletes.

Men

Qualification legend: ADV – Advanced due to being impeded by another skater; FA – Qualify to medal round; FB – Qualify to consolation round.

Women

Qualification legend: ADV – Advanced due to being impeded by another skater; FA – Qualify to medal round; FB – Qualify to consolation round

Skeleton

Based on the world rankings, the United States qualified 4 sleds.

Ski jumping

Men

Women

Snowboarding

Freestyle
Men

Women

Parallel

Snowboard cross
Men

Qualification legend: FA – Qualify to medal round; FB – Qualify to consolation round

Women

Qualification legend: FA – Qualify to medal round; FB – Qualify to consolation round

Speed skating

Distance
Men

Women

Mass start

Team pursuit

 Qualification legend: FA – Qualify to gold medal final; FB – Qualify to bronze medal final; FC – Qualify to 5th place final; FD – Qualify to 7th place final

Events

Potential withdrawal
In early December 2017, United States Ambassador to the United Nations, Nikki Haley, told Fox News that it was an "open question" whether the United States was going to participate in the games, citing security concerns in the region. However, days later the White House Press Secretary, Sarah Huckabee Sanders, stated that the United States "looks forward to participating" and will attend. Concerns were later assuaged.

Coin toss controversy
Luge athlete Erin Hamlin carried the flag during the opening ceremony. Following a vote, which ended up in a 4-4 tie between Hamlin and speed skater Shani Davis, the winner was decided via a coin toss in accordance with the rules. Davis eventually skipped the opening ceremony, citing his training schedule.

See also
United States at the 2018 Winter Paralympics
United States at the 2018 Summer Youth Olympics

References

External links

 2018 U.S. Olympic Team

Nations at the 2018 Winter Olympics
2018
Winter Olympics